Austria, officially the Republic of Austria, is a European country.

Austria may also refer to:

Places
On earth
 Austria (European Parliament constituency)
 Austria (Lombard), a region in the Lombard kingdom of Italy
 Archduchy of Austria, a constituent crown land and core region of Austria-Hungary, the Austrian Empire, and the Habsburg Monarchy
 Duchy of Austria
 Margravate of Austria
 Lower Austria
 Upper Austria
 Further Austria
 Austrian Circle

Historical Era
 Habsburg monarchy or Austria (1526–1918)
 Austrian Empire (1804–1867)
 Austria-Hungary (1867–1918)
 Republic of German-Austria (1918-1919), Rump state created out of the German-speaking parts of Austria-Hungary
 First Austrian Republic (1919–1934)
 Federal State of Austria (1934–1938)
 Margravate of Austria
 Lower Austria
 Upper Austria
 Further Austria
 Austrian Circle

Space
 136 Austria, an asteroid

Sports
 A1 Team Austria, the Austrian team of A1 Grand Prix
 FC Red Bull Salzburg or SV Austria Salzburg
 FK Austria Wien
 SC Austria Lustenau
 SV Austria Salzburg, the refounded club

Other uses
 Austria (personification), a personification of the country, to which Čechie was a reaction
 Austria (surname)
 Austria (typeface), a typeface formerly used on all official road signage in Austria
 "Austria", a hymn tune based on "Gott erhalte Franz den Kaiser" by Haydn
 Austria Metall AG, a holding company
 Austria Microsystems, a semiconductor manufacturer
 SS Austria, a ship launched in 1857
 MV APL Austria, a ship constructed in 2007

See also

 
 Austrian (disambiguation)
 Australia (disambiguation)
 Austra (band), a Canadian New Wave band
 Austra, an island in Norway
 Australia, continent-country in the Southern Hemisphere 
 Austrasia, north-eastern portion of the Kingdom of the Merovingian Franks
 Austria-Este, the last ruling house of the Duchy of Modena
 Austria-Hungary (1867–1918)
 Norðri, Suðri, Austri and Vestri, dwarves in Norse mythology
 SK Austria Klagenfurt (disambiguation)
 Osterreich (disambiguation)
 Asturias